Hanganu is a Romanian surname. Notable people with the surname include:

Dan Hanganu (1939–2017), Romanian-born Canadian architect
Ovidiu Cornel Hanganu (born 1970), Romanian footballer

Romanian-language surnames